Romania competed at the 2015 Summer Universiade in Gwangju, South Korea.

Medal by sports

Medalists

Athletics

Handball

Romania participated with a team composed of: Elena Șerban, Ana Maria Măzărean, Cristian Enache (goalkeepers), Ana Maria Apipie, Alexandra Maria Gavrilă, Maria Mădălina Zamfirescu, Cosmina Lia Cozma, Andreea Trăilă Mihăilă, Elena Cristina Florică, Roxana Diana Cîrjan, Maria Cristina Nan, Laura Petruța Popa, Georgiana Cătălina Preda, Dana Laura Leahu, Bianca Elena Tiron, Carmen Gabriela Șelaru-Ilie.

Judo

Men

Women

Shooting

Men

Women

Table tennis

Taekwondo

References
 Country overview: Romania on the official website
 

2015 in Romanian sport
Nations at the 2015 Summer Universiade
Romania at the Summer Universiade